AM & Shawn Lee are a musical duo based in Los Angeles and London and composed of producer, DJ, and songwriter AM and producer and multi-instrumentalist Shawn Lee.

Discography

Albums
 Celestial Electric (2011)
La Musique Numérique (2013)
 Outlines (2015)

Music videos
 "Dark Into Light": created and directed by A Bigger Plan 
 "Good Blood": created and directed by A Bigger Plan

Radio
 regular rotation airplay on KCRW’s Morning Becomes Eclectic, New Ground, and the nationally syndicated Sounds Eclectic
 performed live on KCRW's Morning Becomes Eclectic with Jason Bentley
 performed live on KEXP, #11 at KEXP

Awards and achievements
The song "Two Times," from AM & Shawn Lee's album La Musique Numérique, was named “Song of the Day” by KEXP on August 23, 2013, and "Dark Into Light," from Celestial Electric, was named “Song of the Day” on August 8, 2011.

Song appearances on television
"City Boy" (from Celestial Electric)
Criminal Minds (CBS; episode: "Painless"; air date: October 12, 2011)
"Somebody Like You" (from Celestial Electric)
Castle (ABC; episode: "Clear & Present Danger"; air date: October 13, 2014)
The Mindy Project (Fox)
"Automatic" (from La Musique Numérique)
How I Rock It (Esquire Network)

References

External links
Official site

Musical groups from Los Angeles
Musical groups from London
American musical duos
British musical duos